The 1958 C-130 shootdown incident was the shooting down of an American Lockheed C-130A-II-LM reconnaissance aircraft which had intruded into Soviet airspace during a reconnaissance mission along the Turkish-Armenian border.

Incident

On September 2, 1958, a Lockheed C-130A-II-LM (s/n 56-0528), from  the 7406th Support Squadron, departed Incirlik Airbase in Turkey on a reconnaissance mission along the Turkish-Armenian border. The six flight crew were confirmed dead when their remains were repatriated to the United States, but the 11 intelligence-gathering personnel on board have never been acknowledged by Soviet / Russian authorities. After the fall of the Soviet Union a US excavation team found hundreds of skeletal fragments; two remains were identified. A group burial of the 17 crew remains was held at Arlington National Cemetery.

Reasons for entering Soviet airspace 
The exact cause of why the aircraft strayed into Soviet airspace is unknown, but according to the Aviation Safety Network, the crew may have confused a radio beacon in the USSR with similar frequencies to the Turkish beacons they were briefed to use, or it may have been a deliberate maneuver to obtain better data.

When NSA cryptologists William Hamilton Martin and Bernon F. Mitchell defected to the Soviet Union in 1960, they listed the C-130 flight as one of their reasons. They contended that it was designed to gain an understanding of Soviet defenses, and that it therefore represented an American interest in attacking the Soviets rather than defending against them. James Bamford agrees with their analysis.

Memorial 

In 1993, Armenian sculptor Martin Kakosian unveiled a khachkar, a traditional Armenian cross stone, at the site of the aircraft's crash in the village of Nerkin Sasnashen. Kakosian had witnessed the crash as a college student on a field trip in 1958. This khachkar later fell over and cracked, and a joint US-Armenian memorial was built to commemorate the site. In 2011, the US Army Office of Defense Cooperation renovated the village kindergarten in appreciation of the villagers' commemoration of the downed airmen.

References

External links
 NSA website of C-130 shootdown
 Crew Of A United States Air Force at ArlingtonCemetery.net, an unofficial website

Violations of Soviet airspace
Soviet Union–United States relations
Aviation accidents and incidents in the Soviet Union
Cold War military history of the United States
1958 in the Soviet Union
1958 in Turkey
September 1958 events in Europe
Accidents and incidents involving the Lockheed C-130 Hercules
20th-century aircraft shootdown incidents